Rincon Valley is a valley through which the Rio Grande flows in New Mexico. Its mouth is at an elevation of  where it emerges from a narrow canyon between the Selden Hills on the northeast bank of the river and Robledo Mountains on the southwest bank, into the Mesilla Valley at Radium Springs in Doña Ana County, New Mexico.

References

Landforms of Doña Ana County, New Mexico
Landforms of Sierra County, New Mexico
Valleys of New Mexico